Diarmaid Ó Cellaigh, King of Uí Maine and Chief of the Name, died c.1349.

References

 The Tribes and customs of Hy-Many, John O'Donovan, 1843
 The Surnames of Ireland, Edward MacLysaght, Dublin, 1978.
 The Anglo-Normans in Co. Galway: the process of colonization, Patrick Holland, Journal of the Galway Archaeological and Historical Society, vol. 41,(1987-88)
 Excavation on the line of the medieval town defences of Loughrea, Co. Galway, J.G.A.& H.S., vol. 41, (1987-88)
 Anglo-Norman Galway; rectangular earthworks and moated sites, Patrick Holland, J.G.A. & H.S., vol. 46 (1993)
  Rindown Castle: a royal fortress in Co. Roscommon, Sheelagh Harbison, J.G.A. & H.S., vol. 47 (1995)
 The Anglo-Norman landscape in County Galway; land-holdings, castles and settlements, Patrick Holland, J.G.A.& H.S., vol. 49 (1997)
 Annals of Ulster at CELT: Corpus of Electronic Texts at University College Cork
 Annals of Tigernach at CELT: Corpus of Electronic Texts at University College Cork
Revised edition of McCarthy's synchronisms at Trinity College Dublin.

People from County Galway
People from County Roscommon
Diarmaid
14th-century Irish monarchs
Kings of Uí Maine